Apisa is a genus of moths in the family Erebidae.

Species
 Apisa alberici Dufrane, 1945
 Apisa arabica Warnecke, 1934
 Apisa canescens Walker, 1855
 Apisa cinereocostata Holland, 1893
 Apisa fontainei Kiriakoff, 1959
 Apisa grisescens Dufrane, 1945
 Apisa hildae Kiriakoff, 1961
 Apisa manettii Turati, 1924
 Apisa rendalli Rothschild, 1910
 Apisa subargentea Joicey & Talbot, 1921
 Apisa subcanescens Rothschild, 1910

Former species
 Apisa cleta Plötz, 1880
 Apisa connexa Walker, 1854
 Apisa crenophylax Holland, 1893
 Apisa histrio Kiriakoff, 1953
 Apisa kamitugensis Dufrane, 1945
 Apisa kivensis Dufrane, 1945
 Apisa metarctiodes Hampson, 1907
 Apisa sjoestedti Aurivillius, 1904
 Apisa tristigma Mabille, 1893

References

Natural History Museum Lepidoptera generic names catalog

Syntomini
Moth genera